Brentwood Ursuline Convent High School (BUCHS) is an 11–18 girls, Roman Catholic, secondary school and mixed sixth form with academy status in Brentwood, Essex, England. It was established in 1900 and is an Ursuline school. It is located in the Roman Catholic Diocese of Brentwood.

History 
The school first opened in 1900 as a Catholic girls' school, which until the 1990s had boarders. Until the 1918 Education Act, there were two schools, St Mary's for ladies and St Philomena's for tradesmen's daughters. These schools then merged. It was a direct grant grammar school for girls, with the Brentwood School being a similar school for boys. It became a comprehensive in 1979.  In September 1999 the school became a specialist Arts College. It converted to academy status in 2012.

Notable alumni 

 Marie José of Belgium, Princess of Belgium; the last Queen of Italy (in May/June 1946)
 Katie Amess, actress
 Cassyette, musician
 Betty Laine, dance teacher and founder of Laine Theatre Arts

See also 
 Secondary schools in Essex
 List of direct grant grammar schools
 Ursuline High School, Wimbledon

References

External links 
 

Schools in Brentwood (Essex town)
Secondary schools in Essex
Academies in Essex
Girls' schools in Essex
Ursuline schools
Catholic secondary schools in the Diocese of Brentwood
Educational institutions established in 1900
1900 establishments in England